Cremastobombycia grindeliella is a moth of the family Gracillariidae. It is known from California, United States.

The wingspan is about 8 mm.

The larvae feed on Anaphalis margaritacea, Gnaphalium species, Grindelia camporum, Grindelia robusta and Pseudognaphalium stramineum. They mine the leaves of their host plant. The mines occur upon either the upper or lower surface of the leaves. In the upperside mines, the leaf is more contracted and the epidermis is thrown into more distinct folds than is the case in the lower side mines. The elongate white silken cocoon is attached at its posterior end by two fine threads, and at its anterior end by a rather broad band of silk.

References

Lithocolletinae
Moths of North America
Lepidoptera of the United States
Fauna of California
Moths described in 1891
Taxa named by Thomas de Grey, 6th Baron Walsingham
Leaf miners